Edward William Chaillet, III (born 29 November 1944) is a radio drama producer and director, writer and journalist.

Chaillet, American by birth, was born in Boston, Massachusetts but is a "native of Washington" according to The New York Times. He has lived in Britain since 1973.

His newspaper career began at the Washington Evening Star in 1964, interrupted by service in the United States Army. He then lived in Europe, founded the Free State Theater company in Maryland, and studied at the University of Maryland, College Park and California Institute of the Arts.

Chaillet moved to London in 1973 to work at The Times Literary Supplement for the editors Arthur Crook and John Gross 1974–76. He was deputy drama critic (to Irving Wardle) for The Times 1975–83. In 1983 he joined the BBC as Editor, Radio 3 Plays, before becoming a producer for BBC Radio Drama. At the same time (1983–86) he wrote drama criticism for The Wall Street Journal – Europe.

His radio programmes have received five Sony Radio Academy Awards, and the Prix Italia for Fiction in 1997. In 2005 he was nominated by the Directors Guild of Great Britain for Outstanding Achievement in Radio. Between 2008 and 2012, Ned taught Radio and Microphone Technique at the Central School of Speech and Drama (London). In 2013, working with Chris Wallis at Autolycus Productions, he completed the recording of David Suchet's single-voice reading of the entire Bible (New International Version, 2011) for CTVC.

Radio plays

Notes:

Sources:
 Ned Chaillet's radio play listing at Diversity website
 Ned Chaillet's radio play listing at RadioListings website
 Ned Chaillet's radio play listing at Audio Drama Wiki

Journalism
 "Family Voices – Lyttelton", review, The Times, 18 February 1981
 "There is every chance that they are a notable past in the making", The Times, August 1981 (predicting the future for Tony Slattery, Emma Thompson, Stephen Fry and Hugh Laurie from their Edinburgh Fringe debut in 1981)
 "The third man reconstructed", The Independent, 3 August 1998
 Bradley Lavelle Obituary, The Stage, 23 April 2007
 "Erik Bauersfeld, American radio dramatist and producer", Bay Area Radio Drama, 2007
 Harold Pinter Obituary, BBC World Service, 25 December 2008
 Harold Pinter Obituary, The Stage, 29 December 2008
 Jill Balcon Obituary, The Stage, 28 July 2009
 Corin Redgrave Obituary, Last Word, BBC Radio 4, 9 April 2010 (15'50" – 24'05")
 Anna Massey Obituary, The Stage, 19 July 2011
 Miriam Karlin Obituary, The Stage, 22 August 2011
 Gerard Murphy Obituary, The Stage, 9 September 2013
 Betty Davies Obituary, The Guardian, 18 February 2018
 Richard Williams Obituary, The Guardian, 26 Aug 2019
 John Tydeman Obituary, The Guardian, 4 May 2020

References

1944 births
BBC Radio drama directors
BBC radio producers
British theatre critics
California Institute of the Arts alumni
Living people
Prix Italia winners
The Times journalists
University of Maryland, College Park alumni